Walter Kinsella (born August 16, 1900, in New York City, died May 11, 1975, in Englewood, New Jersey) was an American theater, television and radio actor.

In his youth, Kinsella was active as a middle-distance runner in track events, winning more than 120 prizes in competition sponsored by the Amateur Athletic Union.

In the 1920s, he was featured in advertisements for Arrow collars.

Kinsella's first Broadway stage appearance was in 1924, in What Price Glory? His other Broadway credits included Blessed Event, Arrest That Woman, and Juno.

Kinsella's roles on radio programs included:

He also was a regular cast member of The Johnny Morgan Show and That's My Pop.

Kinsella's most noted television role was that of Happy McMann in NBC's detective drama Martin Kane, Private Eye. He also was the announcer for the Kane program. He made a guest appearance on Perry Mason in 1961 as defendant Carter Gilman in "The Case of the Duplicate Daughter."

Kinsella was married and had a son and a daughter.

References

External links
 
 
 Photos of Walter Kinsella

20th-century American male actors
American male stage actors
American male radio actors
American male television actors
1900 births
1975 deaths
Male actors from New York City